Welzl is a surname. Notable people with the surname include:
Emo Welzl (born 1958), Austrian-Swiss computer scientist
Jan Eskymo Welzl (1868–1948), Moravian explorer
Kurt Welzl (born 1954), Austrian footballer

German-language surnames